The Montreal Alouettes are a professional Canadian football team based in Montreal, Quebec, and are members of the East Division in the Canadian Football League (CFL). 

The Alouettes were founded in 1946, and were in continuous operation until the franchise folded after the 1981. A new team, named the Montreal Concordes, was created for the 1982 season and was in operation for four full seasons as the Concordes. In an effort to reconnect with the fans the team changed their name back to the Alouettes for 1986 and then folded just before the regular season in 1987. The current franchise was relocated from Baltimore, Maryland as the Baltimore Stallions in 1996, after it became known that the NFL was relocating a franchise to that city. The CFL and the Montreal Alouettes organization recognize the history of the original Alouettes, the Concordes, and the current Alouettes as one franchise, and do not consider the Baltimore franchise as a part of the team's history. In their history, the team has appeared in 18 Grey Cup finals, and has won seven championships. The current Alouettes head coach in Jason Maas, the current general manager is Danny Maciocia, and the current owner is the S and S Sportsco.

Key

Head coaches
Note: Statistics are current through the 2022 CFL season.

Notes
 A running total of the number of coaches of the Alouettes. Thus, any coach who has two or more separate terms as head coach is only counted once.
 Each year is linked to an article about that particular CFL season.

References
General

Specific

Lists of Canadian Football League head coaches by team

Head coaches